Xinning County is a county in the Province of Hunan, China, it is under the administration of Shaoyang City. Located on the south western margin of Hunan, the county is bordered to the northeast by Shaoyang County, to the northwest by Wugang City, to the west by Chengbu Autonomous County, to the south by Ziyuan County of Guangxi, to the east by Dong'an County. The county has eight towns and eight townships under its jurisdiction, the county seat is Jinshi.

Administrative divisions
As of 2022, Yanling County has 8 towns 6 townships and 2 ethnic townships.
8 towns
 Gaoqiao
 Huanglong
 Huilongsi
 Jinshi
 Langshan
 Matouqiao
 Shuimiao
 Yidushui

6 townships
 Anshan
 Fengtian
 Jingwei
 Qingjiangqiao
 Wantang
 Xuntian

2 ethnic townships
 Huangjin (Yao)
 Malin (Yao)

Ethnic groups
The Xinning County Gazetteer (1995:653) lists the following ethnic groups and their respective locations.
Yao
Malin Township 麻林乡
Huangjin Township 黄金乡
Shuiyuan Village 水源村, Jingwei Township 靖位乡
Miao
Huangjin Township 黄金乡

Climate

See also
 Other Xinnings, particularly the more famous former Xinning County in Guangdong, now Taishan

References

Bibliography
 www.xzqh.org 

 
County-level divisions of Hunan
Shaoyang